William Chaplin may refer to:
 William Chaplin (coach proprietor), British stage coach proprietor and politician
 William L. Chaplin, American abolitionist
 William Robert Chaplin, U.K. government official